Medaglie d'Oro is a station on line 1 of the Naples Metro. It was opened on 28 May 1993 as part of the inaugural section of Naples Metro, between Vanvitelli and Colli Aminei. The station is located between Vanvitelli and Montedonzelli.

Built between 1980s and 1990s on a project by Michele Capobianco and Daniele Zagaria, the station serves the area of Piazza Medaglie d'Oro. The station, present in the Arenella district, is the one at the lowest altitude of the four present in the district, as well as the closest to the border with the Vomero district.

The station has six exits (originally there were seven, then the one placed in the central flowerbed was buried in the 2010s) located in the square above, plus five lifts (from NA 010 to NA 014) for the handicapped. Inside the station, the platforms are served by two platforms.

Services 
The station has:

  Automatic ticket office

Interchanges 
  Bus stop

References

Naples Metro stations
Railway stations opened in 1993
1993 establishments in Italy
Railway stations in Italy opened in the 20th century
Railway stations in Italy opened in the 21st century